St Augustine's is an electoral ward in the town of Penarth, Vale of Glamorgan, Wales. It covers Penarth Head and Penarth Marina northeast of the town centre, including the parish church of St Augustine's. The ward elects three county councillors to Vale of Glamorgan Council and five councillors to Penarth Town Council. The ward is currently represented by the Labour Party.

According to the 2011 census the population of the ward was 6,478.

Background
Following The County Borough of The Vale of Glamorgan (Electoral Changes) Order 2002 the county ward of Alexandra was divided to become St Augustine's and Plymouth wards, effective from October 2003 for preliminary electoral proceedings but fully effective at the May 2004 Vale of Glamorgan Council elections. However, St Augustine's had been a community ward for elections to Penarth Town Council prior to this.

In 2022 the number of county councillors was increased from two, to three.

County council elections

Vale of Glamorgan Council
On 4 May 2017 Labour held on to their two seats they'd won from the Conservatives at the 2012 county council election. Sitting councillor Lis Burnett decided to stand in the neighbouring ward of Stanwell, while Cllr Gwyn Roberts decided not to stand for re-election (though stood in the election for the town council).

South Glamorgan County Council
At the 1985, 1989 and 1993 county elections, St Augustine's elected a county councillor to South Glamorgan County Council. The Labour candidate won each of these elections.

Town Council elections
At the Penarth Town Council election on 4 May 2017 the Conservatives regained a seat they'd lost at the 2012 election. The former Mayor of Penarth, Gwyn Roberts, lost his seat by three votes.

References

Vale of Glamorgan electoral wards
Penarth
Electoral wards of South Glamorgan